Camanche can refer to:

 Camanche Dam in California
 Camanche Reservoir in California
 Camanche, California, a former settlement
 Camanche, Iowa, a city in Clinton County
 Camanche Township, Clinton County, Iowa
 USS Camanche (1864), a warship of the 19th-century United States Navy
 Camanche (ACM-11), a warship of the 20th-century United States Navy

See also
 Comanche